Bakekang is a Philippine television drama series broadcast by GMA Network. The series is based on a Philippine graphic novel by Carlo J. Caparas. Directed by Gil Tejada Jr. and Khryss Adalia, it stars Sunshine Dizon in the title role. It premiered on September 11, 2006 on the network's Telebabad line up replacing I Luv NY. The series concluded on March 30, 2007 with a total of 145 episodes.

Cast and characters

Lead cast
 Sunshine Dizon as Jacoba "Bakekang" Maisog

Supporting cast
 Lovi Poe as Kristal Maisog
 Yasmien Kurdi as Charming Maisog / Lokresha / Karisma
Sheryl Cruz as Valeria Arevalo
Manilyn Reynes as Marta
Jay Manalo as Kristof Arevalo
Gladys Reyes as Deborah Yokohama
Nadine Samonte as Lorraine Arevalo
Dion Ignacio as Aldrin Sandoval
Iwa Moto as Jenny 
Arci Muñoz as Nicole

Recurring cast
Victor Neri as Herman
Cogie Domingo as Johnny
Julia Clarete as Georgia
Tyron Perez as Paolo
Hero Angeles as Daniel Lozano
Vangie Labalan as Mameng
Marky Cielo as Michael
Marky Lopez as Paking
Rainier Castillo as Joshua
Lotlot de Leon as Rita
Soxie Topacio as Vincent
Sheila Marie Rodriguez as Izzy
Jennifer Sevilla as Stella
Dionne de Guzman as Otik
Ailyn Luna as Rea

Guest cast
Eunice Lagusad as young Charming
Krystal Reyes as young Kristal
Joy Folloso as young Lorraine
Renzo Almario as young Michael
Romnick Sarmenta as Francis
Luz Valdez as Maria
Evangeline Pascual as Valeria's mom
Marcus Madrigal as Manfred
Chinggoy Alonzo as Rod
Maritoni Fernandez as Elsa
Isko Moreno as Victor
Kenneth Ocampo as Romy

Accolades

References

External links
 

2006 Philippine television series debuts
2007 Philippine television series endings
Filipino-language television shows
GMA Network drama series
Television shows based on comics
Television shows set in the Philippines